Quitman County School District (QCSD) may refer to:
 Quitman County School District (Georgia)
 Quitman County School District (Mississippi)